Neoclinus is a genus of chaenopsid blennies found in the North Pacific ocean along the coasts of California, Baja California, Japan, Korea and Taiwan.

Species
There are currently 11 recognized species in this genus:
 Neoclinus blanchardi Girard, 1858 (Sarcastic fringehead)
 Neoclinus bryope (D. S. Jordan & Snyder, 1902)
 Neoclinus chihiroe Fukao, 1987
 Neoclinus lacunicola Fukao, 1980
 Neoclinus monogrammus Murase, Aizawa & Sunobe, 2010 
 Neoclinus nudiceps Murase, Aizawa & Sunobe, 2010 
 Neoclinus nudus J. S. Stephens & V. G. Springer, 1971
 Neoclinus okazakii Fukao, 1987
 Neoclinus stephensae C. L. Hubbs, 1953 (Yellowfin fringehead)
 Neoclinus toshimaensis Fukao, 1980
 Neoclinus uninotatus C. L. Hubbs, 1953 (Onespot fringehead)

References

 
Chaenopsidae
 
Marine fish genera
Taxa named by Charles Frédéric Girard